Tatyana Troina (Таццяна Уладзіміраўна Троіна, born 30 June 1981) is a Belarusian basketball player who competed in the 2008 Summer Olympics and in the 2016 Summer Olympics in Rio de Janeiro.

References

1981 births
Living people
Belarusian women's basketball players
Olympic basketball players of Belarus
Basketball players at the 2008 Summer Olympics
Basketball players at the 2016 Summer Olympics
Forwards (basketball)
Basketball players from Minsk
Belarusian expatriate basketball people in Poland